The Coalition for Rescheduling Cannabis is a U.S. organization founded c. 2002 to support removal of marijuana from Schedule I of the Controlled Substances Act. The group was organized immediately after the U.S. Court of Appeals denied the High Times/Jon Gettman petition to reschedule cannabis, ruling that the petitioners were not sufficiently injured to have standing to challenge the Drug Enforcement Administration's interpretation of the scientific record in federal court. On October 8, 2002, the Coalition filed a new petition to have cannabis rescheduled under federal law.

The Coalition has recently filed a Petition for Writ of Mandamus. Carl Olsen of Iowans for Medical Marijuana, a former Coalition member, has filed a motion to intervene.

The organizations comprising the Coalition are:

American Alliance for Medical Cannabis
Americans for Safe Access
California NORML
Drug Policy Forum of Texas
Jon Gettman
High Times
 Los Angeles Cannabis Resource Center
National Organization for the Reform of Marijuana Laws
Oakland Cannabis Buyers Cooperative
Patients Out of Time

See also

Decriminalization of non-medical cannabis in the United States
Legal history of cannabis in the United States
Removal of cannabis from Schedule I of the Controlled Substances Act

References

External links
DrugScience.org
The Cannabis Column - #1 The Coalition for Rescheduling Cannabis, High Times, 5 September 2002
AAMC Joins Battle to Reschedule Cannabis 
Doctors Call On DEA To Reschedule Marijuana For Medical Research Purposes

2002 establishments in the United States
2002 in cannabis
Cannabis law reform organizations based in the United States
Medical associations based in the United States
Medicinal use of cannabis organizations based in the United States
Organizations established in 2002